The 1923 Marshall Thundering Herd football team represented Marshall College (now Marshall University) in the 1923 college football season. Marshall posted a 1–7 record, being outscored by its opposition 28–271. Home games were played on a campus field called "Central Field" which is presently Campus Commons.

Schedule

References

Marshall
Marshall Thundering Herd football seasons
Marshall Thundering Herd football